Karen Anette Anti (born 1972) is a Norwegian Sami politician. From 2017, she has been a member of the Sámi Parliament of Norway. She was elected to the Norwegian Sami National Assembly from the Gáisi constituency as the first Norwegian Sámi Association representative from Målselv.

References

External links
 Karen Anette Anti at Sametinget

1972 births
Living people
People from Målselv
Members of the Sámi Parliament of Norway
Norwegian Sámi politicians
21st-century Norwegian women politicians
21st-century Norwegian politicians